Yin Yong may refer to:

 Yuenyeung
 Yin Yong (politician), born 1969, Mayor of Beijing, China
 Yin Yong (born 1968), at Guiren Branch of Sihong County Postal Bureau, Jiangsu Province, China

See also
Ying Yong